"Naima" is a jazz ballad composed by John Coltrane in 1959 that he named after his then-wife, Juanita Naima Grubbs. Coltrane first recorded it for his 1959 album Giant Steps, and it became one of his first well-known works.

History 
Coltrane recorded "Naima" many times. It appears on The Complete Copenhagen Concert (1961), Live at the Village Vanguard Again! (1966), Afro Blue Impressions (1977), The Complete 1961 Village Vanguard Recordings (1997), and Blue World (2019). "Naima" has since become a  jazz standard.

Structure 
According to Coltrane, "The tune is built  on suspended chords over an E pedal tone on the outside. On the inside – the channel – the chords are suspended over a B pedal tone." The composition, on that recording, is a slow, restrained melody, with a brief piano solo by Wynton Kelly.

Chord changes
Chord changes for "Naima":

 ‖: B–7/E‖ E–7     ‖ Amaj7+5/E  Gmaj7+5/E ‖ Amaj7/E:‖ 
 ‖  Bmaj7/B‖ B79    ‖ Bmaj7/B               ‖ B79‖
 ‖  B-maj7/B‖ Bmaj7/B ‖ Amaj7/B              ‖ Emaj711‖ 
 ‖  B–7/E‖ E–7     ‖ Amaj7+5/E  Gmaj7+5/E ‖ Amaj7/E‖

Scale associations:

 ‖: E Mixolydian          | E Dorian           | F Mel. Minor, E Mel. Minor | A Lydian     :‖ 
 ‖  B Phrygian            | B Dim. Scale (H-W) | B Phrygian                 | B Dim. Scale  |
 ‖  B Alt. (B Mel. Minor) | B Phrygian         | B Mixolydian               | E Lydian       ‖ 
 ‖  E Mixolydian          | E Dorian           | F Mel. Minor, E Mel. Minor | A Lydian      ‖

Other versions

 Les Double Six – The Double Six of Paris: Swingin' Singin (1962)
 John Handy – New View (1967)
 Carsten Meinert – To You (1968)
 Archie Shepp – Four for Trane (1964)
 Tom Scott – The Honeysuckle Breeze (1968)
 McCoy Tyner – Echoes of a Friend (1972), The Greeting (1978), Things Ain't What They Used to Be (1989), and other albums.
 Cedar Walton – Naima (live) (1973)
 Jack Wilkins – Windows (1973)
 John McLaughlin – Love Devotion Surrender (with Carlos Santana, 1973), and After the Rain (1995)
 Lonnie Liston Smith – Cosmic Funk (Flying Dutchman) (1974)
 Arthur Blythe – In the Tradition (1979) and Blythe Byte (2001)
 Maynard Ferguson – Hot (1979)
 David Grisman – Quintet '80 (1980)
 Massimo Urbani – Dedications to A.A. & J.C. – Max's Mood (1980)
 Pharoah Sanders – Heart Is a Melody (1983)
 Skywalk – Silent Witness (1983)
 David Liebman and Richie Beirach – Double Edge (1985)
 Steve Grossman – Love Is the Thing (1985)
 McCoy Tyner – Blues for Coltrane: A Tribute to John Coltrane (1987)
 Pharoah Sanders – Africa (1987)
 Jamaaladeen Tacuma – Jukebox (1988)
 Art Ensemble of Chicago – Dreaming of the Masters Suite (1991)
 Pharoah Sanders – Crescent with Love (1992)
 Joey DeFrancesco – Reboppin (1992)
 Lonnie Smith – Afro Blue (1993)
 Norman Connors – Remember Who You Are (MoJazz) (1993)
 David Murray – Windward Passages (with Dave Burrell, 1993) and Octet Plays Trane (2000)
 James Carter – Conversin' with the Elders (with Hamiet Bluiett, 1996)
 Thom Rotella – Platinum Melodies (1996)
 Derek Trucks Band – The Derek Trucks Band (1997)
 Victor Wooten – What Did He Say? (1997)
 Sonny & Perley, East of the Sun (2000)
 4hero – 2000 compilation The Good Good (2000)
 Alex Bugnon – As Promised (2000)
 Karrin Allyson – Ballads: Remembering John Coltrane (2001)
 Herbie Hancock, Michael Brecker, and Roy Hargrove – Directions in Music: Live at Massey Hall (2002)
 Vato Negro live quartet of Juan Alderete, Adrian Terrazas, Money Mark, and Cedric Bixler (2008)
 Lionel Loueke – Karibu (2008)
 Kindred Spirits Ensemble  – Love Is Supreme (2009)
 Aidan Baker – Passing Thru (2010)
 Royce Campbell – Solo Trane (2010)
 Jaco Pastorius – in the video Modern Electric Bass
 George Benson – Guitar Man (2011)
 Scott Fields and Jeffrey Lependorf – everything is in the instructions (2013)
 Paula Cole – Ballads (2017)
 Jesse Fischer – Flipped II (2018)
 Chrissie Hynde with the Valve Bone Woe Ensemble – Valve Bone Woe (2019)
 David O'Higgins, Rob Luft - O'Higgins & Luft Play Monk & Trane (2019)

Cultural references 
 "Naima" is featured in a scene in the 2013 Polish movie Ida, in which the title character is intrigued by the jazz and its player.
 Kamau Brathwaite's poem "Naima for John Coltrane" was included in the Poems on the Underground project.

References 

1959 compositions
1950s jazz standards
Compositions by John Coltrane
1950s ballads
Jazz compositions in B-flat minor